Sibirsky Bereg is a Russian snack food manufacturer based in Novosibirsk in 1999.

In 2009 the company was bought by KDV Group.

History
In 1999, Sibirsky Bereg purchased the production technology for rusk manufacturing from Grand Company (Saint Petesburg) as well as the brand name of this product (Kirieshki).

In June 2004, Sibirskiy Bereg acquired the assets of the Ukrainian chips factory Kristall Plus (Dnepropetrovsk).

In May 2005, Sibirsky Bereg bought 100% of the shares of Bolzhau (snack food company from Kazakhstan).

In 2007, the company built a plant in Tashkent, where it began to produce rusks under the brand name Kirieshki.

In 2009, Tomsk KDV Group bought Sibirsky Bereg.

Brands
Kirieshki, Kompashki, BEERka, Fun, Chipsons, etc.

References

Manufacturing companies based in Novosibirsk
Russian companies established in 1999
Food and drink companies of Russia
Snack food manufacturers